The Brotherhood is the seventh and final album by American hard rock band Lynch Mob.

Track listing

Personnel
 Oni Logan – vocals
 George Lynch – guitar
 Sean McNabb – bass
 Jimmy D'Anda – drums

Chart history

References

Lynch Mob (band) albums
2017 albums